"Parasite" is a song by American hard rock band Kiss, released in 1974 on their second studio album, Hotter Than Hell. The song is one of three songs featured on the album written by lead guitarist Ace Frehley. As one of the album's heaviest songs, "Parasite" was performed on the following tour, but Kiss dropped it from the setlist for the Destroyer Tour and did not play it again until the Revenge Tour in 1992. As Frehley was insecure about his singing ability, he passed that duty to Gene Simmons. In 2016, Frehley re-recorded the track with John 5 for Frehley's solo album Origins Vol. 1.

Details 
Discussing the style of "Parasite", and other cuts from Hotter than Hell, Eduardo Rivadavia of Loudwire opined that the song displayed "blue-collar, dare we say proto-punk, greatness".

Appearances
"Parasite" appears on the following Kiss albums:
Hotter Than Hell - studio version
Gold - studio version
Kiss Chronicles: 3 Classic Albums - studio version
Kiss Alive! 1975–2000 - Alive! version
Ikons - studio version
Kiss Alive 35 - live version

Cover versions
Anthrax's version first appeared as the B-side of their 1988 single "Antisocial". It was re-released on the 1991 compilation Attack of the Killer B's and 1994 live album Live: The Island Years.
Sebastian Bach's live video Forever Wild contained a cover of the song.
 Ace Frehley recorded an updated version for his 2016 covers album, Origins, Vol. 1.
Amphetamine Reptile recording artists Mog Stunt Team cover the song on their 1997 album King of the Retards.

Personnel
Gene Simmons – lead vocals
Ace Frehley – lead guitar, bass, backing vocals
Paul Stanley – rhythm guitar, backing vocals
Peter Criss – drums

References

1974 songs
Kiss (band) songs
Anthrax (American band) songs
Songs written by Ace Frehley